William John Stack (born 17 January 1948) is an English former footballer who played as a left winger.

Career
In January 1965, Stack graduated from Crystal Palace's youth system. In two seasons at the club, Stack made two Football League appearances before joining Chelmsford City.

References

External links
Stack at holmesdale.net

1948 births
Living people
Association football wingers
English footballers
Footballers from Liverpool
Crystal Palace F.C. players
Chelmsford City F.C. players
English Football League players